Meerkat was a mobile app that enabled users to broadcast live video streaming through their mobile device. Once signed up, Meerkat users had the option of connecting their Facebook and Twitter accounts, to stream directly to their followers as soon as they went live. The app was available for both iOS and Android.

The app was released in February 2015, and quickly found popularity after its debut on the website Product Hunt, as well as widespread use during the South by Southwest Interactive Festival, both in March 2015.

On October 4, 2016, Meerkat was shut down.  It has been replaced by Houseparty.

Development

Meerkat was developed by Life On Air, Inc., a team headed by founder and CEO Ben Rubin. The back-end powering the app was developed over the course of two years for a previous video product of theirs.

The company raised $12 million in venture capital funding from Greylock Partners in March 2015.

On October 4, 2016, The app was withdrawn from the App Store and Play Store, and all services have stopped. The Meerkat website now redirects to the creator's new app, Houseparty. The creators have said that the new app "has been in development for 10 months, and moves away from public broadcasts in favour of private chats."

Twitter reaction
In March 2015, weeks after the release of Meerkat, Twitter cut off Meerkat's access to its social graph, then announced the acquisition of the competing app Periscope. Twitter publicly launched Periscope on March 26, 2015. Apart from providing the similar functionality of live-streaming to users' Twitter followers, Periscope also gives users an option to let anyone play the stream back.

References

2015 software
Android (operating system) software
IOS software
Twitter services and applications
Live streaming services
Defunct social networking services